Kani Bard (also Romanized as Kānī Bard) is a village in Kani Sur Rural District, Namshir District, Baneh County, Kurdistan Province, Iran. At the 2006 census, its population was 169, in 37 families. The village is populated by Kurds.

References 

Towns and villages in Baneh County
Kurdish settlements in Kurdistan Province